Orde Félix Kittrie is a tenured professor of law at Arizona State University , where his teaching and research focus on international law (especially nonproliferation and sanctions) and criminal law.  He has written extensively in the areas of international law, criminal law, nuclear non-proliferation, and international negotiations.  Professor Kittrie is also the director of ASU's Sandra Day O’Connor College of Law Washington Legal Externship Program.  Professor Kittrie was recipient of the 2006-2007 Centennial Professor of the Year award at ASU, a university-wide honor presented in recognition of outstanding teaching inside and outside of the classroom.

Professor Kittrie is a prolific scholar.  He is the author of Lawfare: Law as a Weapon of War     He is also the author of numerous scholarly articles in journals including the University of Michigan Law Review, Iowa Law Review, Syracuse University Law Review, University of Michigan Journal of International Law, University of Pennsylvania Journal of International Law, and Case Western Journal of International Law. In addition, he served in 2012 as the elected Chair of the Committee on Scholarship of the Association of American Law Schools.

Kittrie has published articles in media outlets including the Wall Street Journal, Foreign Affairs, National Interest, Arms Control Today, and the Arizona Republic.  
He has also been a speaker at numerous universities including Harvard, Yale, Columbia, Johns Hopkins, King’s College London, Georgetown, the University of Michigan, and the University of Pennsylvania.  In addition, he has done on-air commentary for television and radio networks and stations including Al Jazeera, Fox, Christian Broadcasting Network, Univision, NBC, and ABC.

Professor Kittrie is a leading expert on legal issues relating to nuclear nonproliferation.  Kittrie has testified on nonproliferation issues before both the U.S. Senate and U.S. House of Representatives.  During 2008, Professor Kittrie served on a National Academies of Science committee created by Congress (in the National Defense Authorization Act for Fiscal Year 2008) to issue a report, in time for the next Administration, assessing and making recommendations to improve current U.S. government programs to prevent the proliferation of nuclear, chemical and biological weapons.  In February 2008, Kittrie wrote a chapter for a report produced by the National Academies of Science, in coordination with the Russian Academy of Sciences, entitled The Future of the Nuclear Security Environment in 2015.   Professor Kittrie’s chapter describes and analyzes several critical legal issues that must be successfully managed if future U.S.-Russian nuclear security cooperation is to be maximized.  In 2005, Kittrie served on the National Academies of Science committee which produced with the Russian Academy of Sciences a joint report entitled Strengthening US-Russian Cooperation on Nuclear Nonproliferation, for which Kittrie wrote the chapter on legal obstacles and opportunities.  Kittrie served for several years as chair of the  Nonproliferation, Arms Control and Disarmament Committee of the  American Society of International Law.

Prior to 2004, Kittrie worked for eleven years at the United States Department of State. For three years, Kittrie served as an attorney specializing in trade controls, in which capacity he was a principal drafter of U.N. Security Council Resolutions, U.S. Executive Orders, and U.S. regulations imposing and implementing embargoes on terrorism-supporting and other outlaw regimes.   After that, Kittrie served for three and a half years as a State Department attorney specializing in nuclear affairs.  In that capacity, Kittrie participated in negotiating five nuclear non-proliferation agreements between the United States and Russia and served as counsel for the U.S. Government's sanctions and other responses to the 1998 Indian and Pakistani nuclear tests. Kittrie also helped negotiate at the United Nations the Convention for the Suppression of Acts of Nuclear Terrorism (a treaty designed to thwart terrorist acquisition, use or threat of use of nuclear material).  Prior to law school, Kittrie served as press spokesman and legislative assistant for foreign affairs and defense to a Member of Congress.

A Mexican-American, Professor Kittrie is active in the Latino community, including service in 2006 as President of the Hispanic National Bar Association’s Southwest Region.   Kittrie was also named by Hispanic Outlook on Higher Education as one of the United States’ four most notable Hispanic professors of international law.  In 2006, he received the Dr. Manuel Servin Faculty Award (2006) from the Chicano Faculty/Staff Association of Arizona State University (an annual award to one faculty member for exemplary mentorship, scholarship and service to the Hispanic community).  In 2012, he was honored by the Latino Law Students Association of the University of Michigan Law School with that year's J.T. Canales Award, which honors one “alumnus who has made a significant contribution to empowering the Latino community” each year.

He is a graduate of Walt Whitman High School in Bethesda, MD; Yale University; and the University of Michigan Law School.

References

External links
 Orde F. Kittrie homepage at ASU
 https://global.oup.com/academic/product/lawfare-9780190263577?cc=us&lang=en&
 http://works.bepress.com/orde_kittrie/
 

Arizona State University faculty
Living people
Year of birth missing (living people)
University of Michigan Law School alumni
Walt Whitman High School (Maryland) alumni